"When I Was a Youngster" is the second official single released by British hip hop duo Rizzle Kicks, from their debut studio album, Stereo Typical. The single was released on 21 October 2011 in the United Kingdom. The song samples a ska sample from "Revolution Rock" by The Clash. A music video to accompany the release of "When I Was A Youngster" was uploaded to YouTube on 7 September 2011 at a total length of two minutes and fifty-nine seconds. It features British musician Ed Sheeran throwing shoes at Rizzle Kicks. The duo performed the song live for the first time on The Xtra Factor on 23 October 2011. It was featured in the opening ceremony for the 2012 Summer Olympics in London.

Track listing

Charts

Weekly charts

Year-end charts

Release history

References

2011 singles
Island Records singles
Rizzle Kicks songs